Madhuurima Banerjee (born 14 May 1987), also known by her stage name Nyra Banerjee, is an Indian actress who appears predominantly in Telugu, Hindi, Malayalam and Kannada language films. Following appearances in various television serials, she made her feature film debut in director Srinivasa murthy Nidadavole's Telugu comedy film Aa Okkadu which was a moderate success, and then went on to act in several successful Telugu films including Vamsi's Saradaga Kasepu in 2010. She acted in Bollywood film One Night Stand. She also assisted director Tony D'Souza for his film Azhar.

Early life
Banerjee learned Hindustani classical music and ghazal from her mother and used to sing children's songs. She also learned the classical dancing form Kathak but had to discontinue due to her father's transferable job. While recording a song one day, she was spotted by noted director G. V. Iyer who signed her on for the Hindi television serial Kadambari. She was supposed to play Sita's role in a film adaptation of Ramayana that G. V. Iyer was planning to shoot, but the director died and the project failed to materialise. However, owing to her studies had to turn down some big banners, until Priyadarshan managed to convince her to play the lead in his movie.

Banerjee's official name is Madhuurima. In order to avoid confusion with her contemporary actress Madhurima Tuli, she changed her screen name to her pet name Nyra in 2016. In an interview with The Times of India, she stated: "I don't want any association with my old name 'Madhuurima'. In fact, I want everyone to get into the habit of calling me Nyra."

Career 
The same year she appeared in her first Telugu film. She went on to act in three Telugu projects within the next year, including the female lead role in Vamsy's Saradaga Kasepu and a cameo role in Orange, directed by Bhaskar. However, none of the Telugu films helped her career. In 2012, her second Bollywood film, Kamaal Dhamaal Malamaal, directed by Priyadarshan, released.

In 2014 she was first seen in the Telugu film Veta, which was followed by her first Kannada release, Savaari 2, and her first Malayalam release, Koothara. Savaari 2 saw her playing a bank manager, while in Koothara she played the role of Shaista, an NRI. She then starred in Maruthi's Kotha Janta starring Allu Sirish and made a special appearance in Green Signal which was co-produced by Maruthi.

In early 2015, she was seen in Puri Jagannadh's Temper, which very successful and for which she was critically acclaimed. She then appeared in two Tamil films, Serndhu Polama helmed by Malayalam director Anil Kumar and Sundar C.'s Aambala.  She is working on the Telugu film Close Friends, and has completed the Malayalam film Black Coffee, in which she plays a Malayali living in Mumbai.

She also assisted director Tony D'Souza for his film Azhar.

In 2019, she played the role of Divya in Star Plus's Divya Drishti opposite Sana Sayyad.

Filmography

Films

Television

Music videos

References

External links

 
 

1987 births
Living people
Indian film actresses
Actresses from Mumbai
21st-century Indian actresses
Actresses in Telugu cinema
Actresses in Hindi cinema
Actresses in Kannada cinema
Actresses in Malayalam cinema
Actresses in Tamil cinema